|}

This is a list of House of Assembly results for the 2018 South Australian state election.

Results by district

Adelaide

Badcoe

Black

Bragg

Chaffey

Cheltenham

Colton

Croydon

Davenport

Dunstan

Elder

Elizabeth

Enfield

Finniss

Flinders

Florey

Frome

Gibson

Giles

Hammond

Hartley

Heysen

Hurtle Vale

Kaurna

Kavel

King

Lee

Light

MacKillop

Mawson

Morialta

Morphett

Mount Gambier

Narungga

Newland

Playford

Port Adelaide

Ramsay

Reynell

Schubert

Stuart

Taylor

Torrens

Unley

Waite

West Torrens

Wright

See also
 Candidates of the 2018 South Australian state election
 Members of the South Australian House of Assembly, 2018–2022

References

2018
2018 elections in Australia
2010s in South Australia